3Shape is a developer and manufacturer of 3D scanners and CAD/CAM software for the dental and audio industries based in Copenhagen, Denmark. The company has production facilities and offices in China, Europe, Latin America and the USA.

History
The underlying technology was developed by Tais Clausen in connection with his master thesis at Technical University of Denmark. He teamed up with Copenhagen Business School graduate student Nikolaj Deichmann, founding the company in 2000. The company has been named “Entrepreneur of the Year” by Ernst & Young three times. Flemming Thorup  was CEO of the company from 2002 to 2017.

3Shape has been the recipient of the Cellerant Best in Class award for 2015, 2016, and 2017.

References

Dental companies
Technology companies of Denmark
Technology companies based in Copenhagen
2000 establishments in Denmark
Danish brands
3D scanners
Companies based in Copenhagen Municipality